Fernando Torres Durán (2 August 1937 – 13 November 2019) was a Panamanian Roman Catholic bishop.

Durán was born in Colombia. He served as titular bishop of Abaradira and as auxiliary bishop of the Roman Catholic Archdiocese of Panamá, Panama from 1996 to 1999. Durán then served as bishop of the Roman Catholic Diocese of Chitré, Panama, from 1999 to 2013.

Notes

1937 births
2019 deaths
Roman Catholic bishops of Panamá
Roman Catholic bishops of Chitré